Henry FitzHugh may refer to:

Nobility
Henry FitzHugh, 3rd Baron FitzHugh (c. 1363 – 1425), English administrator and diplomat
Henry FitzHugh, 1st Baron FitzHugh (d. 1356), Baron FitzHugh
Henry FitzHugh, 5th Baron FitzHugh, Baron FitzHugh

Others
Henry Fitzhugh (1801–1866), American merchant and politician
Henry FitzHugh (MP), for Yorkshire (UK Parliament constituency)
Henry Fitzhugh (burgess) (1706–1742), Virginia planter, burgess 
Henry Fitzhugh (sheriff) (1687–1758), Virginia planter, sheriff and burgess, uncle of Henry Fitzhugh (burgess)

See also